The Architectural Institute of Korea (AIK) is the only academic organization on architecture in Korea.  Established in 1945, today AIK has more than 10,000 members.  They represent architects, building engineers, researchers, architecture students and teachers, and public officials.

The organization’s activities are in three different categories: academic research; information research (including four regularly published journals); and, educational and public activities.

AIK is led by a governing body and has eight local chapters across Korea.  Its national offices are located in Seoul, South Korea.

AIK has special exchange agreements with allied organizations worldwide, including the Architectural Institute of Japan (AIJ), the Architectural Society of China (ASC), and the Association of Collegiate Schools of Architecture (ASCA) of the United States.

External links

References 

Architecture-related professional associations
Architecture in South Korea
Organizations established in 1945